Ivan Yevhenovych Vyshnevskyi (born 21 February 1957 in the village of Chortoryia (today's Myrolyubivka, Ternopil Raion); died 11 May 1996 in Dnipropetrovsk of melanoma) was a Ukrainian footballer.

Career
He earned six caps for the USSR national football team, making his debut on 25 January 1985 in a friendly against Yugoslavia. He was selected for the UEFA Euro 1988 squad, but did not play in any games at the tournament.

He is from the region that once belonged to Wiśniowiecki family that had estates near Zboriv where the village of Vyshnivets is located.

Honours 
 Soviet Top League winner: 1988.
 Soviet Top League runner-up: 1987, 1989.
 Soviet Top League bronze: 1984, 1985.
 Soviet Cup winner: 1989.
 Turkish President Cup winner: 1990.
 Turkish Prime Minister Cup winner: 1989.
 Turkish Super League runner-up: 1990.

External links
Profile 

1957 births
1996 deaths
Ukrainian footballers
Soviet footballers
Soviet expatriate footballers
Ukrainian expatriate footballers
Soviet Union international footballers
UEFA Euro 1988 players
FC Spartak Moscow players
FC Dnipro players
Fenerbahçe S.K. footballers
Sarıyer S.K. footballers
Expatriate footballers in Turkey
Soviet Top League players
Süper Lig players
Deaths from melanoma
FC Nyva Vinnytsia players
Association football defenders
Soviet expatriate sportspeople in Turkey
Ukrainian expatriate sportspeople in Turkey
Sportspeople from Ternopil Oblast